Strand Releasing is an American film production company founded in 1989 and is based in Culver City, California. The company has distributed over 300 auteur-driven titles from acclaimed international and American directors such as Apichatpong Weerasethakul, Gregg Araki, François Ozon, Jean-Luc Godard, Catherine Breillat, Claire Denis, Fatih Akin, Aki Kaurismäki, Claude Miller, Manoel de Oliveira, Gaspar Noé, André Téchiné and Terence Davies.

Notable reissues
Comic Book Confidential (1988; 2012 reissue) by Ron Mann
Kiss of the Spider Woman (1985; 2001 reissue) by Héctor Babenco
Pink Narcissus (1971; 2003 reissue) by James Bidgood
 The Graduate (1967; 1997 re-release) by Mike Nichols
 Faster, Pussycat! Kill! Kill! (1965; 1995 re-release) by Russ Meyer
 Who Killed Teddy Bear (1965; 1995 re-release) by Joseph Cates
 Contempt (1963; 1997 re-release) by Jean-Luc Godard

Movies produced
Daughter of Mine (2018)
Zama (2017)
Tyrannosaur (2011)
Bad Actress (2011) executive produced by Marcus Hu and Jon Gerrans
 Happiness Runs (2010)
 Feed the Fish (2009)
 Slipstream (2007)
 Psycho Beach Party (2000)
 Innocence (2000)
 Just One Time (1999) executive produced by Marcus Hu
I Stand Alone (1999)
 Billy's Hollywood Screen Kiss (1998) executive produced by Marcus Hu
 First Love, Last Rites (1997)
 Hustler White (1996)
 Frisk (1995)
Stalingrad (1995)
 Mod Fuck Explosion (1994) executive produced by Marcus Hu 
 Grief (1993) executive produced by Marcus Hu 
 The Living End (1992)

LGBT titles
Postcards from London (2018) by Steve McLean
Sorry Angel (2018) by Christophe Honoré
The Cakemaker (2017) by Ofir Raul Graizer
Holding the Man (2016) by Neil Armfield
Front Cover (2015) by Ray Yeung
Mala Mala (2014) by Antonio Santini and Dan Sickles
 Lilting (2014) by Hong Khaou
 The Way He Looks (2014) by Daniel Ribeiro
 Noordzee, Texas (2012) by Bavo Defurne
Desire (2012) by Laurent Bouhnik
 L.A. Zombie (2010) by Bruce LaBruce
 Hideaway (2009) by François Ozon
 Otto (2008) by Bruce LaBruce
 Before I Forget (2007) by Jacques Nolot
 Saturn in Opposition (2007) by Ferzan Özpetek
 The Witnesses (2007) by Andre Techine
 The Bubble (2006) by Eytan Fox
 Time to Leave (2005) by François Ozon
 The Dying Gaul (2005) by Craig Lucas
 Mysterious Skin (2004) by Gregg Araki
 Party Monster (2003) by Randy Barbato and Fenton Bailey
 Son Frere (2003) by Patrice Chéreau
 Yossi and Jagger (2002) by Eytan Fox
 Porn Theater (2002) by Jacques Nolot
 Burnt Money (2002) by Marcelo Piñeyro
 Princesa (2001) by Henrique Goldman
 His Secret Life (2001) by Ferzan Özpetek
 Lan Yu (2001) by Stanley Kwan
 Borstal Boy (2000) by Peter Sheridan
 101 Rent Boys (2000) by Randy Barbato and Fenton Bailey
Muscle (1999) by Hisayasu Satō
 Skin Flick (1999) by Bruce LaBruce
 Criminal Lovers (1999) by François Ozon
 Show Me Love (1998) by Lukas Moodysson
 Macho Dancer (1998) by Lino Brocka
 Head On (1998) by Ana Kokkinos
 Edge of Seventeen (1998) by David Moreton
 Steam (1997) by Ferzan Özpetek
 The Delta (1996) by Ira Sachs
 Hustler White (1996) by Bruce LaBruce
 Stonewall (1995) by Nigel Finch
 Wild Reeds (1994) by André Téchiné
 Totally F***ed Up (1993) by Gregg Araki
 Super 8½ (1993) by Bruce LaBruce
 No Skin Off My Ass (1993) by Bruce LaBruce
 The Living End (1992) by Gregg Araki
 Swoon (1992) by Tom Kalin
 Young Soul Rebels (1991) by Isaac Julien
Tongues Untied (1989) by Marlon Riggs
 Looking for Langston (1989) by Isaac Julien
 Three Bewildered People in the Night (1987) by Gregg Araki

Honors and awards
Strand Releasing was honored with a four-week retrospective in 1999 at the New York Museum of Modern Art. The Los Angeles Gay and Lesbian Film Festival, Outfest, honored Strand Releasing with a lifetime achievement award in 2002. In 2009, MOMA honored Strand Releasing with "Carte Blanche" a 20-year retrospective honoring select filmmakers from the Strand roster including Apichatpong Weerasethakul, Fatih Akin, François Ozon and Jacques Nolot, adding their films into the MOMA permanent collection. In 2009, the Yerba Buena Center for the Arts in San Francisco, the Provincetown International Film Festival and the Seattle International Film Festival also honored Strand Releasing with lifetime achievement awards.

Archive
The Strand Releasing Collection at the Academy Film Archive contains trailers and prints for many films released by Strand.

References

External links
 
 Strand Releasing Distributor Profile
 Strand Releasing 20th at MOMA

Film distributors of the United States
Entertainment companies based in California
Companies based in Culver City, California
Entertainment companies established in 1989
1989 establishments in California
LGBT organizations in the United States